MUP may refer to:
 Main Upgrading Programme, a housing programme in Singapore.
 Major urinary proteins
 Motor unit potential
 Master of Urban Planning

 Melbourne University Press (or Publishing)
 Manchester University Press
 Metropolitan University Prague
 Ministry of Internal Affairs (Serbia) (Ministarstvo Unutrašnjih Poslova)
 Ministry of the Interior (Croatia) (Ministarstvo Unutarnjih Poslova)
 Multi-use Path
 Multiple UNC Provider - a concept related to Microsoft Windows Universal Naming Convention (UNC)
 An alternate representation of μP, which is an abbreviation for microprocessor
 Popular Unity Movement (French: Mouvement d'Unité Populaire), Tunisian political party
 The ISO 639-3 code for the Malvi language